Ovie is a given name, nickname and surname. It may refer to:

Nickname
 Alexander Ovechkin (born 1985), Russian ice hockey player
 Ovie Alston (1905–1989), American jazz trumpeter, vocalist, and bandleader
 Ovie Ejaria (born 1997), English footballer

Given name
 Ovie Carter (born 1946), American newspaper photographer
 O. C. Fisher (1903–1994), American politician, attorney and author
 Ovie Mughelli (born 1980), American former National Football League fullback
 Ovie Omo-Agege (born 1963), Nigerian lawyer and politician
 Ovie Scurlock (1918–2016), American horse racing jockey
 Ovie Soko, basketball player and 2019 Love Island contestant
 Ovie, a character in the Western television series Tales of Wells Fargo

See also
 Ovey

Lists of people by nickname